Alexander Graydon Jr. (1752–1818) was an author and officer in the American Revolution. He was commissioned captain on January 5, 1776 and commanded a company of men in the Battle of Long Island and in the Battle of Harlem Heights. He was taken prisoner during the Battle of Fort Washington. After the war, he was elected as prothonotary of Dauphin County, Pennsylvania (1785–1799).

He wrote his memoirs in 1811, chronicling his life and times in which he lived.  His work became popular when it was republished posthumously in 1822, 1828, and 1846.

Life and family

Graydon was born on April 10, 1752 in Bristol, Pennsylvania to Alexander Graydon (d. 1761) and Rachel Marks (d. 1807). His parents were married on February 14, 1747. He died in Philadelphia on May 2, 1818.

Publications 
 
 
 
 Alexander Graydon. Life of an Officer, Written during a Residence in Pennsylvania, Edinburgh, 1828.

References

External links
 

United States military personnel of the American Revolution
American writers
1752 births
1818 deaths